Pop music in Ukraine is Western influenced pop music in its various forms that has been growing in popularity in Ukraine since the 1960s.

Decades

1970s 
The 1970s saw the emergence of a number of folk rock groups. One of the most prominent was a group known as Kobza which included 2 electric banduras. Initially it started off as an instrumental group playing folk inspired cool jazz. Other groups gradually appeared on the scene primarily from Western Ukraine such as Medikus, Smerichka. 
Major contributions were made by songwriter Volodymyr Ivasiuk and singer Sofia Rotaru and Nazariy Yaremchuk.

In a development the KGB defined as "radio hooliganism", from the end of the sixties thousands of high-school and college students In Dnipropetrovsk became ham radio enthusiasts, recording and rebroadcasting western popular music. Annual KGB reports regularly drew a connection between anti-Soviet behavior and enthusiasm for western pop culture, but in 1980 conceded that all ideological and police efforts had failed to stem its spread.

1980s 
After the death of V. Ivasiuk in 1978, developments in Ukrainian pop music almost ground to a halt. Even established folk -rock groups such as Kobza began to sing in Russian. The songs of Ivasiuk were rarely heard on the radio and many of the established singers such as Sofia Rotaru began to sing in Russian exclusively.

Many Ukrainian musicians moved to Moscow, and various Moscow based Pop groups had a pop songs in the Ukrainian language such as the group Samotvety - Verba.

Following Mikhail Gorbachev's perestroika reforms, a small number of pop acts such as Russya and Vechirnya Shkola came on the scene, performing the Soviet italo disco pop that was becoming popular throughout the USSR.

1990s 
The 1990s saw an explosion in the Ukrainian Pop music world. This was brought on by the Chervona Ruta FestivalChervona Ruta Festival]] which was held in Chernivtsi in 1989 and sponsored by the Kobza corporation and Pisennyi Vernisazh - New Ukrainian Wave 92 (Kyiv) sponsored / producing by the Rostyslav - Show Agency. At the end of the 80's it was considered that Ukrainian language based rock would not be effective. 
The sponsoring of a Ukrainian only festival did much to change this perception.
Music groups (hoort) that came to prominence were:
Komu Vnyz
Ne zhurys'
Taras Petrynenko and Hrono
In the 1900s Ukrainian music in itself was not as popular as it is in this day. Green Grey was by far the most popular trip hop group in the country. Green Grey was the first Ukrainian band that was endorsed by Pepsi. The band did many concerts internationally.
At the end of the 90 most popular pop singer among teenagers was Yurko Yurchenko. At his concerts was something unimaginable. Many compared the level of fanaticism with the band "The Beatles".

2000s 

In recent times folkloric elements have made a resurgence in modern Ukrainian pop music. Hutsul folk melodies, rhythms and dance moves were used by the Ruslana, winner of the Eurovision Song Contest 2004.

Sofia Rotaru – released a number of Ukrainian language albums that were in top chart positions (Yedinomu)
Okean Elzy – popular rock band
Ruslana - singer, composer, pianist, conductor - Won the Eurovision Song contest for Ukraine in 2004
Verka Serduchka - singer
Svetlana Loboda - singer
VIA GRA
nikitA
neAngely
Potap & Kamenskikh
Vremya I Steklo Highly popular duo with the biggest name recognition in the West of all Ukrainian and Russian Language artists
Ani Lorak
Anyuta Slavskaya
Natalka Karpa
Natalia Mohilevska (Nataliya Mogilёvskaya)
Zlata Ognevich - singer - represented Ukraine at the Eurovision Song Contest 2013 and participated in the Ukrainian national selections in 2010, 2011, 2012 and 2013.
Anastasia Prikhodko - singer - represented Russia at the Eurovision Song Contest 2009 and participated in the Ukrainian national selection in 2009, 2011 and 2016.

Ukrainian pop and folk music arose with the international popularity of groups like Vopli Vidoplyasova, Viy, Okean Elzy, and so on.

The group Kazaky became one of Ukraine's first outfits to achieve a degree of international recognition only weeks after its constitution in 2010 by relying on the impact of its video through the internet.

2010s 
Despite the deteriorated relations between Ukraine and Russia in 2016, new Ukrainian bands achieved Russian charts success. The wave of Ukrainian artists making Russian chart success has been labeled "UkrPop". Since the 2014 Russian annexation of Crimea, Okean Elzy and BoomBox stopped performing in Russia, but they were one of the few Ukrainian artists to do so. Most tried to avoid making political statements and continue to perform in Russia. Ukrainian artists and bands with rising success in the 2010s include Maruv, Kazka and The Hardkiss.

In 2016, Ukraine won the Eurovision Song Contest for the second time, this time with Jamala with the song 1944, which was partly sung in Crimean Tatar.
 
On 8 November 2018, a law came into force that mandated Ukrainian radio stations to broadcast no less than 35% of songs in Ukrainian. If it plays 60% of its songs in the official languages of the European Union, then 25% is the minimum.

Styles

Russia pop music in Ukraine

Ukraine has the biggest Russian diaspora (see Russians in Ukraine). In the Soviet Union, Ukraine used to produce up to half of all Russian speaking pop singers in the World. Among the biggest music promoters in Ukraine is Filip Kirkorov and Arkadiy Ukupnik.

Many singers in Ukraine sing in both Russian and Ukrainian languages.

List of Russian speaking singers
 Lolita Milyavskaya – Mukacheve, Zakarpattia Oblast
 Natasha Korolyova – Kyiv
 Vera Brezhneva – Dniprodzerzhynsk (Kamianske), Dnipropetrovsk Oblast
 Stas Kostyushkin – Odesa
 Anna Sedokova – Kyiv
 Anastasia Stotskaya – Kyiv
 Iosif Kobzon – Chasiv Yar, Donetsk Oblast
 Svetlana Loboda – Kyiv
 Tatiana Ovseyenko – Kyiv
 Lyudmila Senchina – village in Bratske Raion, Mykolaiv Oblast
 Anzhelika Varum – Lviv 
 NK – Kyiv
 Potap – Kyiv
 Verka Serduchka – Poltava
 Olya Polyakova – Vinnytsia
 Yolka – Uzhhorod

List of singers in both languages
 Taisia Povaliy – village in Bila Tserkva Raion, Kyiv Oblast
 Ani Lorak – Kitsman, Chernivtsi Oblast
 Natalia Mogilevskaya – Kyiv
 Sofia Rotaru – village in Novoselytsia Raion, Chernivtsi Oblast
 Oleg Vinnik – village in Cherkasy Raion, Cherkasy Oblast
 Monatik – Lutsk
 Melovin – Odesa

Rock 
Ukrainian rock bands include Braty Hadiukiny/Брати Гадюкіни, Komu Vnyz, Plach Yeremiyi/Плач Єремії, Taras Petrynenko, Viy, Vopli Vidoplyasova, Yurcash, Burning Hearts and others. Opalnyi Prynz/Opalni Prinz/Опальний Принц was, perhaps, the most influential Rock band in the late 80's. Okean Elzy, featuring Slava Vakarchuk has long been among the most popular bands of Ukrainian pop-rock, and has had some success abroad.  The pop-singer Ruslana also uses some elements of rock in her work. The Hardkiss - one of the outstanding Ukrainian indie-bands. Interesting in rock music is Skryabin.

The Rock legends of Ukraine is a series of compilations of the best works of known Ukrainian rock groups.

New wave of rock music in Ukraine is represented by such bands as TOL, Skinhate (Hardcore), Flëur, Ya i Drug Moi Gruzovik, Snuff, Pictures Inside Me, Fakultet (New Metal), S.K.A.Y. (Pop rock), Marakesh (Alternative rock), Holy Blood (Folk metal), Kara, FACTOR 150 (Christian Metalcore), Robots Don't Cry (Punk rock), Opozitsiya, xDeviantx, E42, The Homebodies, Jinjer (Metalcore / Prog Metal), etc.

Black Metal 
Influenced by their Norwegian counterparts, Black Metal bands include Nokturnal Mortum, Lucifugum, Drudkh, Hate Forest, Astrofaes, Holy Blood, Blood of Kingu, Raventale, Lutomysl and Dub Buk.

A Cappella vocal groups 

Pikardiyska Tertsiya, Mensound

Singer-songwriter 
Viktor Morozov, Andriy Panchyshyn, Eduard Drach. Юрко Юрченко

Fusion groups 
The band Mandry is known for fusing traditional Ukrainian music with rock, blues, reggae and chansons.

Hip-hop 
One of the prominent groups is Tanok Na Maydani Kongo ("The Dance on the Congo Square") which raps in the Ukrainian language (specifically the Slobozhanshchyna dialect) and mix hip hop with indigenous Ukrainian elements. Most Hip-hop in Ukraine is however in Russian.

Ukraine's 2005 entry in the Eurovision Song Contest, GreenJolly's "Together We Are Many", had recently been the unofficial anthem of the Orange Revolution. Eurovision required the lyrics be changed for the contest version because of rules against political content.

Recently a new artist named Vova zi Lvova (literally "Vova (Volodymyr) from Lviv"), part of a collective known as Chorne ta Bile ("Black and White"), has entered onto the Ukrainian hip hop scene, gaining attention not only because of his serious lyrics (compared to groups such as TNMK, which frequently sing humorous or joke songs) but also because of his unique usage of the Ukrainian language in his lyrics.

Popular performers in Ukraine
Vopli Vidoplyasova – Ukrainian folk-rock (http://vopli.com.ua)
Plach Yeremiji – rock music
Mandry - Mix of Ukrainian folk-rock and other genres (http://www.mandrymusic.com)
Viy – Ukrainian folk-rock (https://web.archive.org/web/20080505045203/http://www.viy.in.ua/)
DakhaBrakha – folk music
The Hardkiss – progressive-pop
Yurcash - Ukrainian folk-rock, ska, punk
Hrystyna Soloviy - Ukrainian folk-pop

Music of the Ukrainian Diaspora 

Pop music in the Ukrainian diaspora took off in the mid sixties in Western Canada with cover recordings by the Drifters 5 of Beatles tunes. They were followed by performers such as Mikey and Bunny.
In the 1970s Montreal positioned itself as a major centre for Ukrainian Diaspora pop music mainly through the efforts of Bohdan Tymyc and his Yevshan corporation. Yevshan released numerous recordings by Zabava bands such as Rushnychok, Syny stepiv. It is through Yevshan that Luba Kovalchuk recorded here first recordings and started her rise through an album called Zoria (Album cover by Maurice Prokaziuk).

Julian Kytasty – singer, composer, kobzar, bandurist
Mariana Sadovska – singer, composer
Eugene Hutz of Gogol Bordello
Victor Mishalow – composer, kobzar, bandurist

Ukrainian labels
 Atlantic music (1991)
 Audio Ukraina (1991)
 Zone records (1996)
 Moon records (1997)
 Rostok records (1997)
 Nova records (1997–2001)
 JRC (Joint Recording Company, 1998)
 Lavina music (2001)
 Empire Label (2007-2010)
 Mozgi Entertainment (2010)

References

External links 

Ukrainian ethnomusocological resources:
Ukrainian folk songs
Ukrainian folk songs
Lemko folk songs
Ukrainian folk songs
Ukrainian folk songs
List of the Ukrainian labels

Ukrainian music
Pop music by country